A by-election was held for the New South Wales Legislative Assembly seat of Lachlan on 6 June 1943. It was triggered by the death of Griffith Evans.

Dates

Result 

Griffith Evans died.

See also
Electoral results for the district of Lachlan
List of New South Wales state by-elections

References 

1943 elections in Australia
New South Wales state by-elections
1940s in New South Wales